James E. Porter (1857–1946) was an American politician, born in Cass County, Missouri, and the mayor of Kansas City, Kansas, from 1910 to 1913.

References

External links 
 

1857 births
1946 deaths
People from Cass County, Missouri
Mayors of places in Kansas
Politicians from Kansas City, Kansas